Lavrinenko (may be spelled as Lawrinenko, Lavrynenko, Lavrenenko, Lavrinenco) is a Ukrainian surname. Notable people with the surname include:

 Aleksandr Lavrinenko (born 1961), Ukrainian sport shooter
 Aleksey Lavrinenko (born 1955), Russian politician
 Nataliya Lavrinenko (born 1977), Belarus rower
 Serhiy Lavrynenko (born 1975), Ukrainian footballer
 Yuri Lavrynenko (born 1977), Ukrainian footballer

See also
 

Ukrainian-language surnames
Patronymic surnames
Surnames from given names